Sergio Galdós and Leonardo Mayer were the defending champions but only Galdós chose to defend his title, partnering Ariel Behar. Galdós lost in the semifinals to Gonçalo Oliveira and Grzegorz Panfil.

Miguel Ángel Reyes-Varela and Blaž Rola won the title after defeating Oliveira and Panfil 7–5, 6–3 in the final.

Seeds

Draw

References
 Main Draw

Lima Challenger - Doubles
2017 Doubles